Himantoglossum robertianum  is a species of flowering plant in the orchid family (Orchidaceae) native to the Mediterranean Basin.

Description
Himantoglossum robertianum is a bulbous plant. It flowers from January to April. The bulb is edible when cooked.

Distribution and habitat
Himantoglossum robertianum is native to the Mediterranean Basin and is found in Portugal, Morocco, Spain, Balearic Islands, France, Italy, Sardinia, Corsica, Algeria, Libya, Yugoslavia, the Greek mainland, the Aegean Islands and Crete, Anatolia and Cyprus, and recently (March 2023) found in Israel. It is found in short, poor grassland, garrigue, scrub, and open woodland. It prefers dry to moist, alkaline and calcareous substrates. It can be found up to  altitude. 
The plant was found growing in Britain for the first time in 2022. It is believed that its distribution range is expanding due to the effects of climate change.

References

robertianum
Flora of Southwestern Europe
Flora of Southeastern Europe
Flora of North Africa
Taxobox binomials not recognized by IUCN